Raoulia australis, the scabweed or scab plant, is a species of flowering plant in the family Asteraceae, native to New Zealand. It is used as a ground cover.

References

Gnaphalieae
Endemic flora of New Zealand
Flora of the North Island
Flora of the South Island
Plants described in 1846